Carole André-Smith (born 11 March 1953) is a French-Italian former actress. Her best known role was Kabir Bedi's love interest Lady Marianna, nicknamed "", in the successful RAI series Sandokan (1976). Since retiring from acting, she has been the International Marketing Director at Cinecittà Studios, as well as an architect and interior designer.

Life and career
Growing up in Rome as the daughter of French actress Gaby André and American businessman Ely Smith, Carole André already spent time on the sets of Cinecittà at a very early age. In an interview, she remembered she "was always happy at Cinecittà. It felt like I was in another dimension, where crazy things were normal."

In 1967, her mother was invited to Tomas Milian's place and showed him family photographs. Milian, who at the time starred in the Spaghetti Western Face to Face, presented them to the director, Sergio Sollima, who agreed to cast Carole, then 14 years old, in a small part. There followed another small part in another Spaghetti Western later that year. At the age of 15, she acted in Mario Monicelli's black comedy Oh, Grandmother's Dead (1969).

In I tulipani di Haarlem (1970) directed by Franco Brusati, André played the lead role of an insecure girl longing for affection. The film ran in competition at the Cannes Film Festival. In an interview she gave in 1974, André considered it her most important film.

In Violentata sulla sabbia (1971), she was in the lead again. The film did poorly at the box office, and André started taking smaller roles again in films directed by Luchino Visconti (Death in Venice), Mario Camerini (Don Camillo e i giovani oggi) and Duccio Tessari (The Bloodstained Butterfly). In 1973, Dino Risi cast her for a bigger role again: She played the girlfriend of an industrialist (Marcello Mastroianni) in Dirty Weekend.

In 1976, André became famous when Sergio Sollima, with whom she had had her debut, gave her the role of Lady Marianna, "Pearl of Labuan", in the successful TV series Sandokan, which subsequently also received a theatrical release.

After this, and having in brief succession lost both her parents to tragic circumstances, André left the world of cinema to devote herself to her partner, the producer Paolo Infascelli, and their newly-born son Elia Infascelli-Smith, moving to live among relatives in America and also studying architecture and interior design.

In 1980, she returned to Italy and appeared intermittently in a number of TV serials and cinematic films until the early 1990s.

At the age of 40, André developed a passion for swimming and recently started to compete in swimming tournaments for seniors. In 2018, she won the 200 meter freestyle race at the "Campionati Regionali Master Lazio" at the Zero9 pool in Rome under the name Carole Wendy Smith, setting a new record.

André now holds the position of International Marketing Director at Cinecittà.

Selected filmography

Bibliography

References

External links

1953 births
Living people
French film actresses
Actresses from Paris
20th-century French actresses